Theta Geminorum (θ Gem, θ Geminorum) is a single star in the northern zodiac constellation of Gemini. It is visual to the naked eye with an apparent visual magnitude of 3.59. Based upon an annual parallax shift of 17.25 mas, it is about 189 light years distant from the Sun.

This is an evolving A-type subgiant star with a stellar classification of A2 IV. It has 1.80 times the mass of the Sun and radiates 93 times the solar luminosity. At an estimated distance of this star, this yields a physical size of about 5.1 times the radius of the Sun. It is around 252 million years old and has a projected rotational velocity of 133 km/s. This rotation rate is giving the star an oblate shape, with an equatorial bulge that is 11% larger than the polar radius.

The Washington Visual Double Star Catalog lists five visual companions within 100″; the closest and brightest such companion is the magnitude 8.6 θ Geminorum E at an angular separation of 2.4″ along a position angle of 295°, as of 2010.

References

A-type subgiants
Geminorum, Theta
Gemini (constellation)
Durchmusterung objects
Geminorum, 34
050019
033018
2540